Pinaki Chandra Ghose (born 28 May 1952) was the 1st Lokpal of India serving since 23 March 2019 to 27 May 2022. He is a retired judge of the Supreme Court of India.

Early life and education
Justice Ghose has had a longstanding association with The Ramakrishna Mission. He had his schooling at The Ramakrishna Mission Vidyapeeth at Deogarh and Purulia.

Career
Prior to his elevation to the Supreme Court, he had served as Chief Justice of the Andhra Pradesh High Court, and before that, as a Judge of the Calcutta High Court. At the time of appointment he was a member of the National Human Rights Commission. During his tenure as the judge of the High Court at Calcutta, he was the Executive Chairman of West Bengal State Legal Services Authority and the Andaman and Nicobar Legal Services Authority. He was also appointed a member of the National Legal Services Authority.

Justice Ghose serves as a Vice President of the Institute of Culture, Golpark. He is the Chairperson of the Board of Governors of Belur Vidyamandir - B.Ed College.

He served as a member of the Executive Committee of the National University of Juridical Sciences at Calcutta as the nominee of the Chief Justice of India.

Justice Ghose as the Chief Justice of Andhra Pradesh was also the Chancellor of the National Academy of Legal Studies and Research.

1st Lokpal of India
He was appointed the first Lokpal of India on 19 March 2019 and President of India administered oath to him on 23 March 2019. He will remain at the post till 70 years of his age or up to maximum 5 years whichever is earlier. On 27 May 2022, he has retired from the post of Lokpal due to his superannuation. Pradip Kumar Mohanty, who was serving as a Member (Judicial) of Lokpal was given additional charge of the Lokpal on 28 May 2022.

Family
Justice Pinaki Chandra Ghose is son of Late Shri Justice Sambhu Chandra Ghose, former Chief Justice of Calcutta High Court. He is a fifth generation lawyer from a renowned family of Lawyers. Hara Chandra Ghose, who became the first Indian Chief Judge of the Sadar Dewani Adalat at Calcutta in 1867, was a member of this family.

References

1952 births
Living people
Justices of the Supreme Court of India
Chief Justices of the Andhra Pradesh High Court
Ombudsmen in India
20th-century Indian judges
21st-century Indian judges
University of Calcutta alumni
Judges of the Calcutta High Court